Àger is a municipality in the comarca of the Noguera in Catalonia, Spain. It is situated in the north-west of the comarca, and the territory of the municipality stretches between the Noguera Ribagorçana and Noguera Pallaresa rivers. The Terradets reservoir on the Noguera Pallaresa is situated within the municipality. The village is linked to Balaguer and Tremp by the L-904 road.

Villages
Àger town, 317 inhabitants.
Agulló, 45 inhabitants.
Corçà, 32 inhabitants.
Fontdepou, 16 inhabitants.
Els Masos de Millà, 17 inhabitants.
Millà, 5 inhabitants.
La Règola, 21 inhabitants.
Sant Josep de Fontdepou, 19 inhabitants.
Vilamajor, 13 inhabitants.

See also
Viscounty of Àger
 Apostles from Àger
Montsec

References

 Panareda Clopés, Josep Maria; Rios Calvet, Jaume; Rabella Vives, Josep Maria (1989). Guia de Catalunya, Barcelona: Caixa de Catalunya.  (Spanish).  (Catalan).

External links 

Official website 
 Government data pages 

Municipalities in Noguera (comarca)
Populated places in Noguera (comarca)